Bad Axe High School is a public high school located in Bad Axe, Michigan, United States. It serves grades 7-12 for the Bad Axe Public Schools.

Athletics
The Bad Axe Hatchets compete in the Greater Thumb Conference. School colors are blue and gold. The following Michigan High School Athletic Association (MHSAA) sanctioned sports are offered:

Baseball (boys) 
Basketball (girls and boys) 
Bowling (girls and boys) 
Cross country (girls and boys) 
Football (boys) 
Golf (boys) 
Gymnastics (girls) 
Ice hockey (boys) 
Soccer (girls and boys) 
Softball (girls) 
Tennis (girls) 
Track and field (girls and boys) 
Volleyball (girls) 
Wrestling (boys)

References

External links 

Public high schools in Michigan
Schools in Huron County, Michigan